11 Past the Hour is the sixth studio album by Irish singer-songwriter Imelda May. The album was released on 16 April 2021 by Decca Records. It is May's first album release in four years, following her previous album Life Love Flesh Blood (2017). "Just One Kiss", the first single from the album and a duet with Oasis member Noel Gallagher and featuring the Rolling Stones member Ronnie Wood, was released on 29 January 2021.

Track listing

Charts

References

2021 albums
Decca Records albums
Imelda May albums